Advanced Soaring Concepts was a sailplane manufacturer based in Camarillo, California and owned by Tor Jensen. Their aircraft were marketed in kit form. The aircraft for which they were best known were the Spirit and Falcon kit sailplanes.

One of the company's most notable achievements was the design and construction of the Apex high-altitude, duration flight research sailplane for NASA.

References 

Defunct aircraft manufacturers of the United States
Companies based in Ventura County, California